Temoq is a severely endangered Austroasiatic language spoken in the state of Pahang in the Malay Peninsula. Temoq belongs to the Southern branch of the Aslian languages, along with Semelai, Semaq Beri, and Mah Meri.

References

Sources

External links 
 http://projekt.ht.lu.se/rwaai RWAAI (Repository and Workspace for Austroasiatic Intangible Heritage)
 http://hdl.handle.net/10050/00-0000-0000-0004-163E-2@view Temoq in RWAAI Digital Archive

Languages of Malaysia
Aslian languages